The canton of Andrézieux-Bouthéon is an administrative division of the Loire department, in eastern France. It was created at the French canton reorganisation which came into effect in March 2015. Its seat is in Andrézieux-Bouthéon.

It consists of the following communes: 

Andrézieux-Bouthéon
Aveizieux 
Bellegarde-en-Forez 
Boisset-lès-Montrond 
Chambœuf 
Craintilleux 
Cuzieu 
Montrond-les-Bains 
Rivas 
Saint-André-le-Puy 
Saint-Bonnet-les-Oules 
Saint-Galmier 
Unias 
Veauche 
Veauchette

References

Cantons of Loire (department)